HA-966 or (±) 3-Amino-1-hydroxy-pyrrolidin-2-one is a molecule used in scientific research as a glycine receptor and NMDA receptor antagonist / low efficacy partial agonist. It has neuroprotective and anticonvulsant, anxiolytic, antinociceptive and sedative / hypnotic effects in animal models. Pilot human clinical trials in the early 1960s showed that HA-966 appeared to benefit patients with tremors of extrapyramidal origin.

The two enantiomers of HA-966 have differing pharmacological activity. The glycine/N-methyl-D-aspartate receptor antagonist activity is specific to the R-(+) enantiomer, whereas the sedative and ataxic effects are specific to the S-(-) enantiomer.

R-(+)-HA-966 did not induce drug-appropriate responding in animals trained to discriminate phencyclidine (PCP) from saline, suggesting that the glycine receptor ligand R-(+)-HA-966 has a significantly different behavioral profile than drugs affecting the ion channel of the NMDA receptor complex.

S-(−)-HA-966 has been described as a "γ-hydroxybutyric acid (GHB)-like agent" and a "potent y-butyrolactone-like sedative", but it shows no affinity for the GABAB receptor (GABABR).

See also
 Rapastinel
 NRX-1074

References

Amines
NMDA receptor antagonists
Pyrrolidones